Philip Hawkins may refer to:
 Philip D. Hawkins, British railway painter and photographer
 Philip Hawkins (MP), British politician
 Phillip Thomas Hawkins, molecular biologist
 Phil Hawkins, television and film director